Campanula tommasiniana, known as the Croatian bellflower or Tommasini bell flower, is a perennial species of flowering plant in the family Campanulaceae. It is native to the alpine regions of Croatia. It has gained the Royal Horticultural Society's Award of Garden Merit as an ornamental.

Etymology
The name "tommasiniana" refers to Muzio Giuseppe Spirito de Tommasini, a botanist who is renowned for his work on Dalmatian flora.

Description

Their dark-green leaves are said to be narrow, toothed and lance-shaped.

Cultivation
They prefer to grow in loam, moist and well-drained soil under direct sunlight. They bloom in the summertime. During spring or summer, they can be propagated with cuttings. They are not suited to be indoor plants.

Pests
They may be affect by vine weevils, slugs and snails.

References

tommasiniana
Endemic flora of Croatia
Plants described in 1854